Sheikh Rasheed Ahmad (born 6 November 1950) is a Pakistani politician who served as the 38th Interior Minister of Pakistan from 2020 to 2022. He is the founder and leader of Awami Muslim League, additionally, Rasheed also maintains close relations with the political party Pakistan Tehreek-e-Insaf.

Early life and education
Ahmad was born on November 6, 1950 in Babra Bazaar in Rawalpindi, Punjab.

He received his early education from Polytechnic College and graduated from Government Gordon College. He completed his Bachelor of Laws at the University of Punjab. Ahmad was a leader of the student union at Gordon College.

Political career
Ahmad began his political career during his student years and was actively involved against the military regime of Ayub Khan.

Rasheed was elected to the National Assembly six times. In the 1985 Pakistani general election, which was held on non-party basis, he was elected as the member of the National Assembly for the first time from Rawalpindi. Rasheed was re-elected to the National Assembly for the second time in the 1988 Pakistani general election, this time campaigning on the Islamic Democratic Alliance ticket. In 1990, he campaigned again on the IDA ticket and was re-elected a third time to the National Assembly, later becoming the Minister of Sports. Under his tenure, Pakistan won the world cup in 1992 under the captaincy of Imran Khan. In the 1993 election, he was re-elected, this time on the Pakistan Muslim League (N) ticket. Rasheed was re-elected in 1997, and in 2002 the PML-N refused to allot a ticket to him. He decided to run as an independent, and secured a sixth re-election.

Later, Rasheed joined PML-Q, and because he was a close friend of then-president Pervez Musharraf, he was appointed as Federal Minister for Information and Broadcasting in the Zafarullah Khan Jamali cabinet in November 2002. As minister for information, Ahmed, on public places, had assumed the role of the spokesman of Pervez Musharraf and advocate of government of Zafarullah Khan Jamali.

In May 2006, he was made Federal Minister for Railways. In the 2008 Pakistani general election, Ahmed ran for the seat of National Assembly on a Pakistan Muslim League-Q ticket however, lost the election for the first time from both of his Rawalpindi constituencies, NA-55 and NA-56 to PML-N. There were rumours that Ahmed had fled to Spain following the defeat. However, these allegations were later discovered to be false. In an interview, Ahmed said defeat in the election was due to raid on Lal Masjid and that "he had promised to quit politics after 2008 elections but his defeat had changed his mind."

He later left PML-Q where he was a senior vice-president and created his own political party Awami Muslim League (AML) and self-appointed himself as president of the party.

In February 2010, while Ahmed was preparing to run for the seat of National Assembly in by-election in NA-55, Rawalpindi, he lost the election to Malik Shakeel Awan by an enormous margin. Ahmed earlier supported President Musharraf's military operation against the militants in Federally Administered Tribal Areas and the Siege of Lal Masjid and has been on the hit list of militants. He was left devastated by this embarrassing loss and was spotted smoking his cigar alone at times .

In the 2013 Pakistani general election, Ahmed made an electoral alliance with Imran Khan to support each other in their respective constituencies in the election. It was reported that Ahmed has requested for a merger between his party and the PTI however PTI decided not to go for an alliance with any political party. He was re-elected as the member of the National Assembly for the seventh time from Rawalpindi. In public circles, he is known for making witty remarks and political predictions. He is also known for switching political allegiances from one party to another. In July 2017, he was chosen by the PTI as a candidate for the post of Prime Ministership of Pakistan, following the resignation of outgoing Prime Minister Nawaz Sharif after Panama Papers case decision. He secured 33 votes in the 342 seat parliament and was unsuccessful. He was re-elected to the National Assembly as a candidate of AML from Constituency NA-62 (Rawalpindi-VI) in the 2018 Pakistani general election.

On 18 August 2018, Imran Khan formally announced his federal cabinet structure, and Ahmad was named as Minister for Railways. On 20 August 2018, he was sworn in as Federal Minister for Railways in the federal cabinet of Prime Minister Imran Khan. In 2019, as railway minister, Rasheed severed rail transport links between India and Pakistan due to the revocation of special status for Kashmir.

In December 2020, in cabinet reshuffle, he was given portfolio of minister for interior.

On 10th April 2022, Sheikh Rashid Ahmad was removed from his ministry after the loss of the former Prime Minister Imran Khan in the  no-confidence motion against him.

Controversies
In 2004, Ahmed during his tenure as Minister for Information, Sheikh Rashid Ahmad was replaced with Shaukat Aziz as minister-in-waiting who would receive then visiting Prime Minister of India Atal Bihari Vajpayee after Indian foreign ministry's objection to the nomination of Ahmad as minister-in-waiting.

In 2005, India Today reported that Yasin Malik claimed that Ahmed had run a jihadi camp at Fateh Jung in Punjab, where around 3,500 jihadis were trained. Ahmed denied running such a camp. Later it was reported that Yasin Malik retracted his statements and denied he had ever said that Ahmed running camps.

In 2005, during Ahmed's tenure as Minister for Information, he applied for permit to travel to Srinagar, in his personal capacity to visit the graves of his grandparents and meet his relatives in Jammu & Kashmir. However India denied Ahmed's request to travel to Srinagar.

In 2012, Ahmed was detained at Houston airport concerning his links with Lashkar-e-Taiba and with Hafiz Muhammad Saeed, an alleged mastermind of 2008 Mumbai attacks. He was released after five hours of interrogation after official protest from Pakistani Ambassador in United States.

In 2014, Ahmed was off-loaded from a Toronto bound PIA flight due to non-issuance of clearance by the Canadian authorities.

In 2018, Ahmad was accused of hiding 100 kanal (12.5 acres) of land from his electoral papers of possessions by Malik Shakeel Awan, Ahmad later confessed he had accidentally forgotten to add the 100 kanal worth of land in his electoral papers of possessions, Ahmad won the case though had confessed to his crime. The decision was accused of being extremely biased towards the Minister and the decision had remained disputed.

Books 
 Farzand-e-Pakistan [Son of Pakistan], 1995, 200 p. His first book, it was a best-seller, having gone through at least 13 editions. 
 Lal Haveli Sey Akwaam-e-Mutthahida Tak [From Lal Haveli to the United Nations], 2020, 352 p.

References

Living people
Punjabi people
1950 births
Pakistani political party founders
Pakistani prisoners and detainees
Minister of Railways (Pakistan)
Pakistani people of Kashmiri descent
Pakistani MNAs 1985–1988
Pakistani MNAs 1988–1990
Pakistani MNAs 1990–1993
Pakistani MNAs 1993–1996
Pakistani MNAs 1997–1999
Pakistani MNAs 2002–2007
Pakistani MNAs 2013–2018
Pakistani MNAs 2018–2023
People from Rawalpindi District
Government of Shaukat Aziz
Government Gordon College alumni
Politicians from Rawalpindi
Information Ministers of Pakistan
University of the Punjab alumni